The "Russian world" is the concept of social totality associated with Russian culture. Russkiy mir as a concept comprises the core culture of Russia and is in interaction with the diverse cultures of Russia through traditions, history and the Russian language. It comprises also the Russian diaspora with its influence in the world. The concept is based on the notion of "Russianness", and both have been considered ambiguous. The "Russian world" and awareness of it arose through Russian history and was shaped by its periods.

In the 21st century the doctrine can be said to hold: that this Russky Mir "has a common political centre (Moscow), a common spiritual centre (Kyiv as the "mother of all Rus"), a common language (Russian), a common church (the Russian Orthodox Church, Moscow Patriarchate), and a common patriarch (the Patriarch of Moscow), who works in 'symphony' with a common president/national leader (Vladimir Putin) to govern this Russian world, as well as upholding a common distinctive spirituality, morality, and culture."

History

Before and during the Russian Empire
One of the earliest use of the term "Russian world" is attributed to the Great Prince Iziaslav I of Kiev in the 11th century in his praise of Pope Clement II: "with gratitude to that faithful slave who increased the talent of his master – not only in Rome, but everywhere: both in Kherson and in the Russian world".

Some, such as Mikhail Tikhomirov, have argued that the 15th-century List of Russian Cities, Near and Far represents an early example of the Russian world concept.

In the 16th century Russia was formed as a self-contained world. Unconsciously, the "Russian world" also absorbed foreign influences from the Western world and the Eastern world/Orient, even if the influences were in the context of the evolution of the "Russian world" rather minor. It was not until the 17th and 18th centuries that the Tsar's throne consciously attempted to Europeanize Russia.

In the Russian Empire, the idea of the "Russian world" was of conservative nationalistic type. Vyacheslav Nikonov, chairman of the Russkiy Mir Foundation, remarked that the "Russian world" did not reach beyond Russia proper. In a 2008 interview, he claimed: "At the beginning of the twentieth century, the Russian world coincided with the Russian Empire, its population numbered 170 million people. The population of the planet then amounted to a billion, which means that every seventh lived in the Russian Empire. Today our population is 142 million, while the world's population has exceeded 6 billion. Today, only one in 50 people lives in Russia."

1990s
Major authors behind the resurrection of the concept in post-Soviet Russia include , Yefim Ostrovsky, Valery Tishkov, Vitaly Skrinnik, Tatyana Poloskova and Natalya Narochnitskaya. Since Russia emerged from the Soviet Union as still a significantly multiethnic and multicultural country, for the "Russian idea" to be unifying, it could not be ethnocentric, as it was in the doctrine Orthodoxy, Autocracy, and Nationality of the late Russian Empire.

In 2000 Shchedrovitsky presented the main ideas of the "Russian world" concept in the article "Russian World and Transnational Russian Characteristics", among the central ones of which was the Russian language. Andis Kudors of the Woodrow Wilson International Center for Scholars, analyzing Shchedrovitsky's article, concludes that it follows the ideas first laid out by the 18th century philosopher Johann Gottfried Herder about the influence of language on thinking (which has become known as the principle of linguistic relativity): the ones who speak Russian come to think Russian, and eventually to act Russian.

Putin era
Russia's president Vladimir Putin visited the Arkaim site of the Sintashta culture in 2005, meeting in person with the chief archaeologist Gennady Zdanovich. The visit received much attention from Russian media. They presented Arkaim as the "homeland of the majority of contemporary people in Asia, and, partly, Europe". Nationalists called Arkaim the "city of Russian glory" and the "most ancient Slavic-Aryan town". Zdanovich reportedly presented Arkaim to the president as a possible "national idea of Russia", a new idea of civilisation which Victor Schnirelmann calls the "Russian idea".

Eventually, the idea of the "Russian world" was adopted by the Russian administration, and Vladimir Putin decreed the establishment of the government-sponsored Russkiy Mir Foundation in 2007. A number of observers consider the promotion of the "Russian world" concept an element of the revanchist idea of the restoration of Russia or its influence back to the borders of the Soviet Union and the Russian Empire.

Other observers described  the concept as an instrument for projecting Russian soft power. In Ukraine, the promotion of the "Russian world" became as early as 2018 strongly associated with the Russo-Ukrainian War. He reconciled that with the conflation of the "Russian world" and the Soviet Union within Russian society itself. The Financial Times described "Russian world" as "Putin’s creation that fuses respect for Russia’s Tsarist, Orthodox past with reverence for the Soviet defeat of fascism in the Second World War. This is epitomised in the Main Cathedral of the Russian Armed Forces, 40 miles west of Moscow, opened in 2020."

Russian Orthodox Church 

On 3 November 2009, at the Third Russian World Assembly, newly-enthroned Patriarch Kirill of Moscow defined the "Russian world" as "the common civilisational space founded on three pillars: Eastern Orthodoxy, Russian culture and especially the language and the common historical memory and connected with its common vision on the further social development".

Russkiy Mir is an ideology promoted by many in the leadership of the Russian Orthodox Church. Patriarch Kiril of Moscow also shares this ideology; for the Russian Orthodox Church, the Russkiy Mir is also "a spiritual concept, a reminder that through the baptism of Rus', God consecrated these people to the task of building a Holy Rus."

As tool of Empire
In the wake of the 2022 Russian invasion of Ukraine the Declaration on the 'Russian World' Teaching that was published on 13 March 2022 called it an "ideology", "a heresy" and "a form of religious fundamentalism" that is "totalitarian in character". As many as 500 Eastern Orthodox scholars allegedly were signatories. They condemned six "pseudo theological facets". Those condemnations concern: replacing the Kingdom of God with an earthly kingdom; deification of the state through a theocracy and caesaropapism which deprives the Church of its freedom to stand against injustice; divinization of a culture; Manichaen demonization of the West and elevation of Eastern culture; refusal to speak the truth and non-acknowledgement of "murderous intent and culpability" of one party.

In the Declaration document, it is said to be an "Orthodox ethno-phyletist religious fundamentalism".

The Russo-Ukrainian War is said to implement the idea of Russian world.
The Economist states that the "Russian world" concept has become the basis of a crusade against the West's liberal culture and this has resulted into a "new Russian cult of war". It says that Putin's regime has particularly debased the "Russian world" concept with a mixture of obscurantism, Orthodox dogma, anti-West sentiment, nationalism, conspiracy theory and security-state Stalinism. It based this analysis on Putin's first public speech after 24 February 2022, wherein he praised the Russian army, using Jesus' words on love as a laying down of one's life. He also referenced Fyodor Ushakov, an admiral who is the Orthodox patron saint of nuclear-armed long-distance bombers. Putin recalled Ushakov's words: "the storms of war would glorify Russia". The Economist also pointed to Patriarch Kirill's declaration of the godliness of the war and its role in keeping out the West's alleged decadent gay culture, and to the priest Elizbar Orlov who said that Russia's "special military operation" in Ukraine is cleansing the world of "a diabolic infection".

On December 25, 2022, in an interview for the national television, Putin, apparently for the first time, openly declared that Russia's goal—not only culturally, but territorially "to unite the Russian people" within a single state.

Condemnations

Orthodox condemnations 

On the 2022 Sunday of Orthodoxy, the Volos Declaration was issued by 1600 theologians and clerics of the Orthodox Church, condemning the ideology of "Russkiy Mir" as being heretical and a deviation from the Orthodox faith.

Following this, among the Orthodox Patriarchates from the Pentarchy, two have condemned the ideology as contrary to the teachings of Christ, linking it to phyletism, an ideology condemned as an heresy by a General Synod in Constantinople in 1872. The first one to do so was the Church of Alexandria and all-Africa and their Patriarch, Theodore II. They were followed by the Ecumenical Patriarchate of Constantinople, the first Orthodox Church in rank and honor. 

In their epistolary exchange of early 2023, the Ecumenical Patriarch, Bartholomew I and the Archbishop of Cyprus, George III, discussed the issue extensively.

See also
 All-Russian nation
 Eurasianism
 Geographical distribution of Russian speakers
 Holy Rus
 Moscow, third Rome
 Pan-Slavism
 Putinism
 Rashism
 Russian imperialism
 Russian irredentism
 Russian nationalism
 Russification
 Russosphere
 Russian civilization
 Pax Americana

References

Sources

Further reading 
 
 
 
 
 
 

Politics of Russia
Russian diaspora
Russian nationalism
Russian irredentism
Russian philosophy